In September 2016, the International Union for Conservation of Nature (IUCN) listed 529 vulnerable mammalian species. Of all evaluated mammalian species, 9.6% are listed as vulnerable. 
The IUCN also lists 53 mammalian subspecies as vulnerable.

Of the subpopulations of mammals evaluated by the IUCN, five species subpopulations and one subspecies subpopulation have been assessed as vulnerable.

For a species to be assessed as vulnerable to extinction the best available evidence must meet quantitative criteria set by the IUCN designed to reflect "a high risk of extinction in the wild". Endangered and critically endangered species also meet the quantitative criteria of vulnerable species, and are listed separately. See: List of endangered mammals, List of critically endangered mammals. Vulnerable, endangered and critically endangered species are collectively referred to as threatened species by the IUCN.

Additionally 783 mammalian species (14% of those evaluated) are listed as data deficient, meaning there is insufficient information for a full assessment of conservation status. As these species typically have small distributions and/or populations, they are intrinsically likely to be threatened, according to the IUCN. While the category of data deficient indicates that no assessment of extinction risk has been made for the taxa, the IUCN notes that it may be appropriate to give them "the same degree of attention as threatened taxa, at least until their status can be assessed".

This is a complete list of vulnerable mammalian species and subspecies evaluated by the IUCN. Species and subspecies which have vulnerable subpopulations (or stocks) are indicated. Where possible common names for taxa are given while links point to the scientific name used by the IUCN.

Pangolins

Sirenia

Odd-toed ungulates
Species

Subspecies

Primates
There are 82 species and 33 subspecies of primate assessed as vulnerable.

Gibbons
Species
Eastern hoolock gibbon
Subspecies
Central lar

Lemurs
Species

Subspecies
Grey lesser bamboo lemur

Tarsiers
Species

Subspecies
Bornean tarsier

Old World monkeys
Species

Subspecies

New World monkeys
Species

Subspecies

Lorisoidea

Cetartiodactyls
Cetartiodactyla includes dolphins, whales and even-toed ungulates. There are 57 species, 12 subspecies, four subpopulations of species, and one subpopulations of subspecies of cetartiodactyl assessed as vulnerable.

Non-cetacean even-toed ungulates
There are 51 species and ten subspecies of non-cetacean even-toed ungulate assessed as vulnerable.

Suids

Giraffid species
Reticulated giraffe
Northern giraffe
Masai giraffe
Southern giraffe

Deer species

Bovids
Species

Subspecies

Other non-cetacean even-toed ungulate species

Cetaceans
Species

Subspecies
Black Sea common dolphin
Eastern spinner dolphin
Subpopulations of species

Subpopulations of subspecies
Northern blue whale (1 subpopulation)

Marsupials
There are 43 marsupial species assessed as vulnerable.

Peramelemorphia

Diprotodontia
There are 25 species in the order Diprotodontia assessed as vulnerable.

Potoroids
Long-footed potoroo

Phascolarctids
Koala

Macropodids

Phalangerids

Pseudocheirids

Shrew opossums
Andean caenolestid
Northern caenolestid

Dasyuromorphia

Opossums

Carnivora
Species

Subspecies

Subpopulations
South American fur seal (1 subpopulation)

Afrosoricida

Eulipotyphla
There are 33 species in the order Eulipotyphla assessed as vulnerable.

Shrews

Erinaceids
Dwarf gymnure

Talpids
Pyrenean desman
Senkaku mole

Lagomorpha

Rodents
There are 140 species and one subspecies of rodent assessed as vulnerable.

Hystricomorpha

Myomorpha
There are 105 species in Myomorpha assessed as vulnerable.

Murids

Cricetids

Nesomyids

Other Myomorpha species

Castorimorpha

Species

Subspecies
Dalquest's pocket mouse

Sciuromorpha
There are 17 species in Sciuromorpha assessed as vulnerable.

Sciurids

Dormice
Balochistan forest dormouse
Roach's mouse-tailed dormouse

Bats
There are 104 species and one subspecies of bat assessed as vulnerable.

Megabats
Species

Subspecies
Yap flying fox

Microbats
There are 64 microbat species assessed as vulnerable.

Old World leaf-nosed bats

Horseshoe bats

Vesper bats

Free-tailed bats

Leaf-nosed bats

Other microbat species

Other mammal species

See also 
 Lists of IUCN Red List vulnerable species
 List of least concern mammals
 List of near threatened mammals
 List of endangered mammals
 List of critically endangered mammals
 List of recently extinct mammals
 List of data deficient mammals

References 

Mammals
Vulnerable mammals
Vulnerable mammals
Mammal conservation